Mountainview is an electoral district which returns a member (known as an MLA) to the Legislative Assembly of Yukon in Canada. It was created in 2009 out of parts of the former districts of McIntyre-Takhini and Copperbelt. It contains the Whitehorse subdivisions of Granger, Valleyview, McIntyre, and Hillcrest.

It is the former riding of the Yukon's 8th Premier, Darrell Pasloski. In the 2021 Yukon Elections, it is the only electoral district with an independent candidate and, thus, the only district with more than three candidates.

Members of the Legislative Assembly

Election results

2021 general election

2016 general election

|-

| Liberal
| Jeanie McLean
| align="right"| 439
| align="right"| 34.6%
| align="right"| +14.5%
|-

| NDP
| Shaunagh Stikeman
| align="right"| 432
| align="right"| 34.0%
| align="right"| -1.0%
|-

|-
! align=left colspan=3|Total
! align=right| 1,270
! align=right| 100.0%
! align=right| –
|}

2011 general election

|-

|-

| NDP
| Stephen Dunbar-Edge
| align="right"| 376
| align="right"| 35.0%
| align="right"| –
|-

| Liberal
| Dave Sloan
| align="right"| 216
| align="right"| 20.1%
| align="right"| –
|-
! align=left colspan=3|Total
! align=right| 1,072
! align=right| 100.0%
! align=right| –
|}

References

Yukon territorial electoral districts
Politics of Whitehorse
2009 establishments in Yukon